Cyclophora lichenea is a moth of the  family Geometridae. It is found on Jamaica.

References

Moths described in 1900
Cyclophora (moth)
Moths of the Caribbean